{{DISPLAYTITLE:C34H46O18}}
The molecular formula C34H46O18 (molar mass: 742.72 g/mol, exact mass: 742.2684 u) may refer to:

 Eleutheroside D
 Liriodendrin

Molecular formulas